Adrian A. Veideman is a Canadian former professional ice hockey Defenseman. He won two National Championships with Denver in 2004 and 2005 as well as Austrian and Norwegian league championships.

Career
Veideman was a high-scoring defenseman for his junior team, the Salmon Arm Silverbacks. He averaged exactly a point per game over two seasons before making the jump to the college ranks with Denver. His offensive output decreased significantly with the Pioneers but Veideman was still a major contributor on defense. He helped Denver win the national championship as a freshman and then repeat the following year. Though Denver missed the tournament in his final two seasons with the program, Veideman served as team captain during his senior season and led them to a winning record.

After graduating with a bachelor's in finance/real estate, Veideman began his professional career with the Augusta Lynx. His scoring from juniors returned in force and he appeared in both the ECHL All-Star Game and on the ECHL All-Rookie Team. While he received a brief callup during the year, it wasn't until 2009 that he got a good shot at the AHL. He performed well during the year but found himself in his third organization the following year. Veideman's stop in Peoria did not turn out well and after just 1 point in 14 games he left the team.

Veideman travelled to Germany and joined the Iserlohn Roosters midway through the year. He played well enough to earn an extension and remained with the club through the end of the 2011 season. Unfortunately, Iserlohn missed the postseason both years and allowed Veideman to leave afterwards. The following year saw Veideman join Black Wings Linz and help the team win both the regular season and postseason titles. With his first league championship in his back pocket, Veideman changed teams again but remained in Austria. Though his offense declined, he helped the Vienna Capitals win a regular season title and then finish as the postseason runners-up. A second regular season title the following year ended with a knockout in the quarterfinals and Veideman was once again on the move. He spent all of the 2015 season with the Stavanger Oilers and helped the club win both league championships. With his playing career winding down, Veideman returned to North America and spent one year with the Colorado Eagles. He led the team in scoring by defensemen and helped the Eagles win the regular season championship and was named a first team all-star. After the team lost in the first round of the playoffs, Veideman retired as a player.

With his playing days behind him, Veideman remained in the area and began working as a real estate agent. While continuing in that role, he could not stay away from hockey and began working as an assistant coach in the local youth league. In 2018 he joined the staff at Valor Christian High where he remains as of 2022.

Career statistics

Regular season and playoffs

Awards and honors

References

External links

1983 births
Living people
Canadian ice hockey defencemen
Ice hockey people from British Columbia
People from the Columbia-Shuswap Regional District
Salmon Arm Silverbacks players
Denver Pioneers men's ice hockey players
NCAA men's ice hockey national champions
Portland Pirates players
Augusta Lynx players
Iowa Stars players
Peoria Rivermen (AHL) players
Iserlohn Roosters players
EHC Black Wings Linz players
Vienna Capitals players
Stavanger Oilers players
Colorado Eagles players